Miturgidae is a family of araneomorph spiders that includes nearly 170 species in 29 genera worldwide. First described by Eugène Simon in 1886, it has been substantially revised, and includes the previous family Zoridae as a synonym, and excludes the family Xenoctenidae. Several genera have also been removed, such as the large genus Cheiracanthium, which was transferred to the Cheiracanthiidae.

Genera 

, the World Spider Catalog accepts the following genera:

Argoctenus L. Koch, 1878 — New Zealand, Australia, Papua New Guinea
Diaprograpta Simon, 1909 — Australia
Elassoctenus Simon, 1909 — Australia
Eupograpta Raven, 2009 — Australia
Hestimodema Simon, 1909 — Australia
Israzorides Levy, 2003 — Israel
Mituliodon Raven & Stumkat, 2003 — Timor-Leste, Australia
Miturga Thorell, 1870 — Australia
Mitzoruga Raven, 2009 — Australia
Nuliodon Raven, 2009 — Australia
Odomasta Simon, 1909 — Australia
Pacificana Hogg, 1904 — New Zealand
Palicanus Thorell, 1897 — Asia, Seychelles
Parapostenus Lessert, 1923 — South Africa, Lesotho
Prochora Simon, 1886 — Italy, Asia
Pseudoceto Mello-Leitão, 1929 — Brazil
Simonus Ritsema, 1881 — Australia
Syrisca Simon, 1886 — South America, Africa
Syspira Simon, 1895 — United States, Mexico
Systaria Simon, 1897 — Asia, Oceania
Tamin Deeleman-Reinhold, 2001 — Indonesia
Teminius Keyserling, 1887 — North America, South America
Thasyraea L. Koch, 1878 — Australia
Tuxoctenus Raven, 2008 — Australia
Voraptus Simon, 1898 — Africa, Indonesia
Xantharia Deeleman-Reinhold, 2001 — Indonesia
Zealoctenus Forster & Wilton, 1973 — New Zealand
Zora C. L. Koch, 1847 — Asia, Europe, North America
Zoroides Berland, 1924 — New Caledonia

References

External links 

 

 
Araneomorphae families